Cepeda de la Mora is a town located in the province of Ávila within the autonomous community of Castile-Leon in north-western Spain.

It has a 31.5 km2 area, a population of 114 inhabitants (2006) and a population density of 3.6/km2.

Cepeda de la Mora is located in Spain's Natural Space La Serrota in the proximities of the Sierra de Gredos Regional Park.

In the page of the Cultural Association you will be able to find more information about the history, the culture and the nature of this village.

Cepeda de la Mora at 1,504 metres is the 6th highest, by altitude above sea level, in the province of Ávila and the 12th highest in Spain.

References

External links
 Cultural Association “El Rollo de Cepeda de la Mora” website

Municipalities in the Province of Ávila